This is a list of electoral districts in the Canadian province of Prince Edward Island.

Current districts
The following 27 districts had been contested in the 2019 Prince Edward Island general election. Each is represented by one seat in the 66th General Assembly of Prince Edward Island.

Cardigan

Charlottetown

Malpeque

Egmont

Former districts 
From Prince Edward Island joining Confederation in 1873 until 1996, the following districts were represented in the General Assembly, with each district electing two members.

Prince County
1st Prince
2nd Prince
3rd Prince
4th Prince
5th Prince

Queens County
1st Queens
2nd Queens
3rd Queens
4th Queens
5th Queens
6th Queens

Kings County
1st Kings
2nd Kings
3rd Kings
4th Kings
5th Kings

Representation history by community

Kings County

Queens County

Prince County

References

External links 
Elections PEI

_
Prince Edward Island
Electoral districts